Closure is fifth and final studio album by Spahn Ranch, released on February 6, 2001, by Cleopatra Records.

Reception

AllMusic awarded Closure four out of five stars, with its review by Alex Henderson saying "'Destruction' and 'Mind Over Matter' are relevant to the industrial-dance and EBM scenes, but, overall, the material is much closer to goth rock's brooding sorrow than industrial's in-your-face anger — and that is true of original songs like 'The Last Laugh' and 'Reasons' as well as an unlikely cover of P.J. Harvey's 'The River,' which is a radical departure from her version and works surprisingly well in a dark wave setting." In writing for Electrogarden, critic Michael Casano awarded the album a ten.

Track listing

Personnel
Adapted from the Closure liner notes.

Spahn Ranch
 Matt Green – guitar, keyboards, melodica, programming, production, engineering, mixing
 Harry Lewis – percussion
 Athan Maroulis – lead vocals, art direction, photography

Additional performers
 Daniel Bryan Harvey – guitar on tracks 2,4

Production and design
 Mark Blasquez – mix doctor on track 3
 Judson Leach – mastering
 Eunah Lee – design

Release history

References

External links 
 Closure at iTunes
 

2001 albums
Spahn Ranch (band) albums
Cleopatra Records albums